Term Htra2 may refer to:

 HtrA2 peptidase, an enzyme class
 HtrA serine peptidase 2, an enzyme that in humans is encoded by the HTRA2 gene